Jai Prakash Yadav  (born 7 August 1974) is an Indian cricketer. He is a right-handed batsman and a right-arm medium-pace bowler.

External links
 

1974 births
Living people
India One Day International cricketers
Madhya Pradesh cricketers
Railways cricketers
Central Zone cricketers
Cricketers from Bhopal
Delhi Giants cricketers